Hoseynabad-e Muqufeh (also Romanized as Ḩoseynābād-e Mūqūfeh; also known as Ḩoseynābād) is a village in Deh Chal Rural District, in the Central District of Khondab County, Markazi Province, Iran. At the 2006 census, its population was 507, in 124 families.

References 

Populated places in Khondab County